Macrochlamys indica or the horntail snail is a species of air-breathing land snail, a terrestrial pulmonate gastropod mollusk, in the family Ariophantidae.

Distribution 
This species occurs in countries including:
 India, Lower Bengal, common at Calcutta.
 Egypt

Further reading 
 El-Alfy N. Z., Al-Ali K. A. & Abdel-Rahim A. H. 1994. Karotype, meiosis and sperm formation in the land snail Macrochlamys indica. Qatar University Science Journal 14(1), 122–128.

Ariophantidae
Gastropods described in 1832
Taxa named by William Henry Benson